Mirror (commonly stylised as MIRROR) is a Hong Kong Cantopop boy group formed through ViuTV's reality talent show Good Night Show - King Maker in 2018. The group consists of twelve members: Frankie Chan, Alton Wong, Lokman Yeung, Stanley Yau, Anson Kong, Jer Lau, Ian Chan, Anson Lo, Jeremy Lee, Edan Lui, Keung To, and Tiger Yau. They debuted on 3 November 2018 with the single "In a Second" (一秒間).

The group has won numerous accolades since their debut, including a Metro Radio Hits Music Award for Best Group, an Ultimate Song Chart Award for Group of the Year (Bronze), and Group of the Year (Gold) at the inaugural Chill Club Music Awards held by ViuTV. Mirror is considered one of the driving forces in the renewed interest of the Cantopop genre and to have prompted an unprecedented wave of fandom culture in Hong Kong. Their 2020 single "Ignited" won Top Ten Song of the Year at the Ultimate Song Chart Awards and the Chill Club Music Awards. Their 2021 single "Warrior" topped the Ultimate 903 Chart for two weeks, the first song from a group to do so in 15 years.

Members of Mirror have also debuted individually, most notably Keung To, who won the Ultimate Song Chart Award for My Favourite Male Singer, and Jer Lau, who won the Best Newcomer Gold Prize. The members have also participated in various drama series, reality shows, and films, most notably Ossan's Love.

Career

2018: Good Night Show - King Maker and formation 
In July 2018, ViuTV's reality talent competition Good Night Show - King Maker started scouting for potential artistes. 99 male contestants successfully auditioned for the show. Participants performed individually and in groups, with a panel of judges deciding who would advance to the next round. The finale aired live on 14 October 2018, with results decided by a public vote and a judging panel. Keung To won the competition, with Ian in second place, and Lokman in third. Anson Kong, Edan, Jeremy, and Stanley all made it to the top 10. ViuTV intended to form a boy group with the top 10 finalists and proceeded with contract talks.

2018–present: Debut and rising popularity 

Mirror officially debuted on 3 November 2018 with twelve members, with Ahfa Wong as the group's manager. According to the group's leader, Lokman, the name Mirror was chosen because "members look in the mirror every morning and see their real selves; when there are multiple mirrors, they can reflect infinite images; similarly, with infinite potential, the combination of these unique members would allow for unlimited possibilities." During the debut press conference, they performed their debut single "In a Second".

On 21 December 2018, they held their first live concert 2018 THE FIRST MIRROR LIVE CONCERT at the Kowloonbay International Trade & Exhibition Centre Star Hall. The tickets were sold from 15 November 2018 and all tickets were sold out. During the concert, apart from performing some original songs, they also performed Korean pop songs including "Love Song" and "Trouble Maker", although they expressed their preference of creating their unique renditions instead of going for a "K-pop feel".

Between January 2019 and November 2020, the group released five more singles, including "ASAP" (2019), "Broken Mirror" (2019), first-year anniversary single "Reflection" (2019), "Ignited" (2020) and "One and All" (2020). "Ignited" won two awards at Hong Kong's major year-end music awards shows, including the Ultimate Song Chart Awards and the inaugural Chill Club Awards.

On 20 January 2021, the group released their debut studio album, One and All, comprising six group singles and fifteen solo songs released by the members in 2020. In March 2021, Mirror released their group single "Warrior", with the lyrics "vastly usher in another new century" which has become a symbol of the group since. "Warrior" topped the Ultimate Song Chart for two consecutive weeks, breaking a 15 year record, and also charted number one on Metro Radio and RTHK.

Originally, Mirror had planned to hold a concert in 2020 to mark the second anniversary of their debut, but it was postponed due to the COVID-19 pandemic. The postponed concert was eventually announced to be held from 6 to 8 May 2021, titled MIRROR "ONE AND ALL" LIVE 2021, at Kowloon Bay International Trade & Exhibition Centre - Star Hall. It was planned to be held at 50% capacity due to the social distancing policy at the time but was increased to 75% capacity after two weeks following government guidelines. Tickets were sold out within minutes on 25 March 2021 for 6 to 8 May, and three more shows from 9 to 11 May were added. 

On 9 June 2021, "Boss" was released. "All In One" was released on November 3, 2021 to mark the group's third anniversary. On 22 December 2021, Mirror released a Christmas themed new single, "12". 

Their twelfth single "Innerspace" was released on 25 April 2022. 

In March 2022, Edan confirmed in an interview that Mirror would be headlining a concert at the Hong Kong Coliseum in Summer 2022. On April 26, they held a press conference announcing their concert, titled MIRROR.WE.ARE. LIVE CONCERT 2022, for ten shows, from 25 to 31 July, and 2 to 4 August. An extra two shows were added for 5 and 6 August, specifically for members of Mirror's fan club, MIRO. On 17 July, Mirror was invited to perform at the prestigious 40th Hong Kong Film Awards. On 22 July, "WE ARE" was released as the theme song for their concert.

2022 Concert Accident 

On 28 July 2022, during the fourth of the twelve planned concerts at the Hong Kong Coliseum, a large overhead video screen fell down onto backup dancer, Moses “Mo” Li Kai-yin, 27, leaving him in critical condition. Li suffered serious damage to his nerves and remains in hospital, but his condition has improved over time. The accident also left a second backup dancer injured, Chang Tsz-fung, who had injuries to his pelvis and cervical spine. The concert was immediately halted and organisers announced the cancellation of remaining concerts. Safety concerns had already been raised early on after dancer, Zisac Law Tak-chi, was reportedly injured during rehearsal, and member of Mirror, Frankie Chan, fell off stage two days prior to the accident.

The HKSAR Government has set up a task force to look into the matter. The Leisure and Cultural Services Department released the investigation report in November 2022.

Comeback 
On 10 October 2022, Mirror released new single, "We All Are", which marked their comeback after a two month hiatus. At the 2022 Ultimate Song Chart Awards Presentation, Mirror won the Best Group Gold Award for the first time, and My Favourite Group Award for the second year in a row. 

On 8 January 2023, Mirror was invited by internationally renowned DJ, Alan Walker, to perform as special guest at his Hong Kong concert, as part of his Walkerverse tour.

Global Debut 
On 17 March 2023, Mirror made their official global debut with the release of their first English single, "Rumours".

Other ventures

Participation in TV programmes 
The first television reality show based on Mirror is Mirror Go, which aired from December 2018. In the show, members of the group played games in different parts of Hong Kong, including Ocean Park and Wu Kwai Sha Youth Village, while other episodes were filmed in Macau, Thailand and South Korea. Lokman said that the show was intended to resemble the South Korean programme Running Man, to provide members with opportunities to overcome challenges, live under the same roof and bond with each other as a group. The second season of the show, Mirror Go 2 released in May 2019. In every episode, a group of two members embarked on different missions, while others had to answer questions based on the footage of these missions. For the last 10 minutes of each episode, two members would partner with a fan and compete against each other in a series of Q&A. In 2021, all members of Mirror participated in ViuTV's game show Battle Feel against ViuTV's other boy group Error, hosted by Kitty Yuen, Dixon Wong and Edan. In early April 2021, the group took part in a variety show titled Be A Better Mirror with actor-director  and the show aired from early June 2021 on ViuTV.

Members of the group have also participated in various television drama series aired on ViuTV. The first television drama with a member of Mirror as part of the main cast was Retire to Queen. Starring Keung To, the television drama aired between June and July 2019. He collaborated with Flora King in the drama. In 2020, a volleyball drama titled We are the Littles aired on ViuTV. It is the first television drama that starred all members of Mirror, with seven of them composing the main cast, including Ian, Anson Lo, Edan, Jer, Tiger, Alton and Jeremy. The other main casts include Stephy Tang and members of boy group Error, while other members of Mirror appeared in guest roles. In Audience at the Folk TV Awards 2020, which was open to public voting, the drama was nominated for various categories and won Best Drama, Best Screenplay and Best Cinematography. Anson Lo won Best Supporting Actor as Bobby in the drama. In June 2021, Edan, Anson Lo, and Stanley starred in the Hong Kong adaptation of the Japanese series Ossan's Love with actor Kenny Wong. Ossan's Love became ViuTV's highest-rated original television series.

Endorsements
Mirror, both individually and as a group, have acquired numerous endorsement deals in various industries throughout their career. They have collaborated with Gucci, Burberry, and Giorgio Armani, and endorsed cosmetics brands such as Shiseido, NARS Cosmetics, Charlotte Tilbury, Laura Mercier, and Estée. They are popular figures in the food industry, endorsing brands such as Häagen-Dazs, Vita, Nestlé, Deliveroo, and Coca Cola. In 2021, three members of Mirror collaborated with McDonald's to release the Hong Kong-exclusive "Keung B Meal", headlined by Keung To. Anson Lo and Ian collaborated with the Hong Kong Tourism Board to promote local attractions during the COVID-19 pandemic in Hong Kong. In August 2021, Samsung Hong Kong announced Mirror as its ambassador for the Galaxy Z Fold3 5G and Z Flip3 5G smartphones. On 8 September 2021, it was announced Anson Lo and Edan Lui were to join the Bvlgari Family and to star as brand ambassadors for their B.zero1 jewellery collections. In September 2021, Calvin Klein Hong Kong unveiled Anson Lo, Anson Kong, Ian Chan and Keung To, as the faces of their 2021 autumn and winter series, with their ad campaigns featuring across Asia. According to a report by admanGO in 2021, Mirror's ads amounted to 70% of Hong Kong's ad market, helping drive up ad spend overall. In October 2021 and December 2022, Mirror collaborated with Mcdonald's Hong Kong to promote the 'Famous Order' campaign. In February 2023, Watsons launched a crossover campaign with Mirror, titled 'Let's Go Green with MIRROR', to encourage customers across the four Asian markets of Hong Kong, Malaysia, Taiwan and Singapore, to make more sustainable choices.

Members

Discography

Album 
 One and All (2021)

Singles

Other songs 
 "金人" (The 40th Hong Kong Film Awards - Theme Song)
 "GO GREEN" (Watsons x Mirror 'Let's Go Green' Theme Song)

Filmography

Film

Dramas

Variety Shows

Radio presenting

Concerts

Impact
Mirror have been described by local and international media as "the new kings of Cantopop", and a "Cantopop phenomenon". They are credited for reviving the Cantopop genre, which had been slowly declining since the 2000s. Mirror's appeal in Hong Kong transcends demographics, and the group is regarded as a "symbol of hope" in a city struggling with political upheaval and the COVID-19 pandemic. Luisa Tam from the South China Morning Post described Mirror as "the latest icon to represent Hong Kong pride", which the city has not seen since the deaths of Cantopop icons Leslie Cheung and Anita Mui in 2003. New York Times reported that there were faces of the group members on "ads for everything". A tongue-in-cheek Facebook group called "My Wife Married Mirror and Left My Marriage In Ruins" gained 300,000 members, more than double the followers count on the official Facebook page. In 2022, Mirror was listed on Tatler Asia's Most Influential.

Awards and nominations

References

External links 

 
 
 
 

Hong Kong boy bands
Cantopop musical groups
Musical groups established in 2018
2018 establishments in Hong Kong
Hong Kong idols
King Maker contestants
King Maker II contestants
MakerVille artists